Enteromius thysi is a species of ray-finned fish in the genus Enteromius which is found in coastal rivers in south-western Cameroon and Bioko.

References 

 

Enteromius
Fish described in 1974
Taxa named by Ethelwynn Trewavas